Guru Ram Rai Darbar Sahib is a Sikh place of worship in Dehradun, India, dedicated to Baba Ram Rai, eldest son of Guru Har Rai, the seventh of the ten Sikh Gurus. Baba Ram Rai settled here with his followers in the mid-17th century, after he was banished by the Sikh orthodoxy for mistranslating scripture in front of the Mughal emperor Aurangzeb, so as to not cause offence. It is believed the city, Dehradun, gets its name from the religious camp established by him: a "dera", or camp, in the "doon" valley. 

The building is historically and architecturally significant, as it derives many of its architectural motifs, like minarets, domes and gardens, from Islamic architecture. While Sikh architecture, in general, drew inspiration from Mughal styles, the Darbar Sahib was unique in that it relied more heavily on elements that give it the appearance of a mosque than a conventional gurudwara. This was unusual in the 17th-18th centuries, as at the time Sikhs were generally in conflict with the Muslim rulers of India. The Islamic influence was the result of a cordial relationship between Baba Ram Rai and the Mughal emperor Aurangzeb, who provided lands and funds for the site.

History
The temple site was founded by Baba Ram Rai in the mid-17th century after he was banished by the orthodox Sikh sect for mistranslating a word in the Adi Granth in front of the Mughal emperor Aurangzeb. He replaced the word "Mussalman" with "faithless" to prevent causing offence. The settlement is believed to have given Dehradun its name: a "dera", or camp, in the "Doon" valley. The central complex of the temple was completed in 1699, twelve years after Baba Ram Rai's death, and the complete structural work was finished between 1703 and 1706; embellishment and painting work is thought to have continued long after the structural completion. Mata Panjab Kaur, Baba Ram Rai's wife, oversaw the construction work and managed the affairs of the Darbar till her death in 1741/42.

Architecture
Unusually for a Sikh place of worship, Indo-Islamic architecture defines the main Darbar structure, which is surrounded by a miniature Mughal-style garden. The central mausoleum was inspired by the Tomb of Jahangir.

Wall paintings
The buildings in the complex were once lavishly decorated with Mughal-style wall paintings, which were specimens of rare wall paintings found in Uttarakhand. The paintings have either been lost to successive re-paintings or re-marblings or are in poor shape and in need of preservation. Some paintings date back to the 17th century and are over 300 years old. Between 2004 and 2014, Archaeological Survey of India carried out restoration work on the historic murals.

Jhanda Mela

Jhanda Mela, literally "flag fair", is an annual religious fair that takes place in the temple precincts; it is believed to have been held since 1676. The fair marks the arrival of Baba Ram Rai at the site, and starts five days after the festival of Holi and continues till Rama Navami. The symbolic flag is a hundred-feet tall tree trunk wrapped in layers of clothing. During the fair, devotees, who come from across India and abroad, gather in large numbers and replace the previous year's flag in a religious ceremony.

Mahants and Gurus
The head of Darbar Sahib, called Sajjada Nashin Shri Mahant leads a life of celibacy and dedicate his life for the noble cause of the society. 
 Shri Mahant Aud Dass (1687-1741)
 Shri Mahant Har Prasad (1741-1766)
 Shri Mahant Har Sevak (1766-1818)
 Shri Mahant Har Swaroop Dass (1818-1842)
 Shri Mahant Preetam Dass (1842-1854)
 Shri Mahant Narayan Dass (1854-1885)
 Shri Mahant Prayag Dass (1885-1896)
 Shri Mahant Lakshman Dass (1896-1945)
 Shri Mahant Indiresh Charan Dass (1945-2000)
 Shri Mahant Devendra Dass (Since 25 June 2000)

Bibliography

References

External links
Official website

Gurdwaras in Uttarakhand
Buildings and structures in Dehradun
Sikh architecture
Indo-Islamic architecture
Architecture in India
Tourist attractions in Dehradun
Religious buildings and structures with domes
Religious buildings and structures completed in 1706
Rebuilt buildings and structures in India
18th-century gurdwaras